The 33rd People's Choice Awards, honoring the best in popular culture for 2006, were held on January 9, 2007 at the Shrine Auditorium in Los Angeles, California. They were hosted by Queen Latifah and broadcast on CBS.

Nominations and winners
The nominees for the awards were selected with the help of Knowledge Networks which used what it describes as an online-only nationally representative panel to identify a pop culture-involved sample of men and women ages 18–49. Winners were chosen online by those who registered with the awards shows official website.

Awards
Winners are listed first, in bold. Other nominees are in alphabetical order.

References

People's Choice Awards
2006 awards in the United States
2007 in Los Angeles
January 2007 events in the United States